The Egypt women's national under-19 volleyball team, represents Egypt in international women's volleyball competitions and friendly matches under the age 19 and it is ruled by the Egyptian Volleyball Federation That is an affiliate of Federation of International Volleyball FIVB and also a part of African Volleyball Confederation CAVB.

Results

Summer Youth Olympics
 Champions   Runners up   Third place   Fourth place

FIVB U19 World Championship
 Champions   Runners up   Third place   Fourth place

African U18 Championship

Team

Current squad

The following is the Egyptian roster in the 2015 FIVB Volleyball Girls' U18 World Championship.

Head Coach: Mohamed Abdeen

References

External links
 www.evbf.org 

National women's under-18 volleyball teams
Volleyball in Egypt
Women's volleyball in Egypt
National sports teams of Egypt